Guruji Shri Rishi Prabhakar (1948–2014) was an Indian yogi who instructed many spiritual teachers across the country. He was the founder of Rishi Samskruti Vidya Kendra, a Public Charitable Trust. He also developed many programs such as Siddha Samadhi Yoga (SSY), Kaya Kalpa Kriya (KKK), Advanced Meditation Course (AMC), Bhava Samadhi Training (BST), Hundred Percent Memory (HMP, also known as RCRT), Infant Siddha Program (ISP) and Inspirational Leadership in Rural Development (ILRD) for the well-being of humanity.

Public life
Rishi Prabhakar oversaw an organisation with over 100 ashrams and 700 centres all over the world. SSY's headquarters are located at a 32-acre campus in Rishi Tapokshetra which is "a yoga finishing school of sorts for a three-day advanced course". Prabhakar's organization has a cancer research center whose goal is to eliminate cancer through yoga and healthy eating. He was on the Board of World Religious Leaders for the Elijah Interfaith Institute.

According to RSVK's web site, he received his spiritual training from his guru, Bhagwan Visweswaraiah and Maharishi Mahesh Yogi.

Personal life
Rishi Prabhakar was born on 1948 in India and lived with his family in the city of Bangalore.

Prabhakar pursued his studies in Aeronautical Engineering at Bangalore University and further pursued his masters in management at Western Ontario University, Ottawa, Canada on a full scholarship, where he acquired Canadian Citizenship. He was also a Computer scientist.

In 1999, Prabhakar married the entrepreneur Smita Ubale, later to be known as Arundhati Ma. They were married for a span of 15 years until Prabhakar's demise in 2014.

Prabhakar and Arundhati Ma were blessed with a son, Siddhant, born in the year 2000 who is currently pursuing his higher education at FLAME University, Pune.

Since Prabhakar's demise, Arundhati Ma, Siddhant, and his mother, Srimati Ramadevi, along with his key disciple Manoj Lekhi, have been playing an active role in Prabhakar's organisation, Rishi Samskruti Vidya Kendra.

Rishi Samskruti Vidya Kendra
Prabhakar's Organisation, Rishi Samskruti Vidya Kendra(RSVK) is a registered trust under Indian Law. RSVK came into existence in the year 1982, with Prabhakar as a founder trustee alongside his mother and a few other individuals. 

The Organisation is dedicated to the promotion of Prabhakar's knowledge, and ever since his demise, it has been looked after by a group of CORE individuals, including his family and disciples from all over India.

References

External links
 Official website
 Enquiries

20th-century Hindu religious leaders
21st-century Hindu religious leaders
University of Western Ontario alumni
1948 births
2014 deaths